Ərəb (also, Arab and Arap) is a village and municipality in the Masally Rayon of Azerbaijan.  It has a population of 1,055.

References 

Populated places in Masally District